The 1983 US Indoors was a women's tennis tournament played on indoor hard courts in Hartford, Connecticut in the United States that was part of the 1983 Virginia Slims World Championship Series. The tournament was held from September 26 through October 2, 1983. Kim Shaefer won the singles title.

Finals

Singles
 Kim Shaefer defeated  Sylvia Hanika 6–4, 6–3
 It was Shaefer's only career title.

Doubles
 Billie Jean King /  Sharon Walsh defeated  Kathy Jordan /  Barbara Potter 3–6, 6–3, 6–4
 It was King's 5th title of the year and the 169th of her career. It was Walsh's 6th title of the year and the 24th of her career.

External links
 ITF tournament edition details

US Indoors
US Indoor Championships
1983 in American tennis